Warburg Pincus LLC is a global private equity firm, headquartered in New York, with offices in the United States, Europe, Brazil, China, Southeast Asia and India. Warburg has been a private equity investor since 1966. The firm currently has over $80 billion in assets under management and invests in a range of sectors including retail, industrial manufacturing, energy, financial services, health care, technology, media, and real estate. Warburg Pincus is a growth investor. Warburg Pincus has raised 21 private equity funds which have invested over $100 billion in over 1,000 companies in 40 countries. 

Warburg Pincus invested in the information and communication technology sectors, including investments in Avaya, Bharti Tele-Ventures, Harbour Networks, NeuStar, PayScale, and Telcordia.

History

Founding and early history
In 1939, Eric Warburg of the Warburg banking family founded a company under the name E.M. Warburg & Co. Its first address was 52 William Street, New York, the Kuhn Loeb building. Throughout the early post-war period, the firm was a small office of 20 employees. In 1966, E.M. Warburg merged with Lionel I. Pincus & Co, forming a new company that eventually became known as E.M. Warburg, Pincus & Co. In 1965, when Eric Warburg retired to Germany, control was handed to Lionel Pincus, a partner in the Ladenburg Thalmann investment bank, and the working language of the office switched from German to English.

In 1967, John Vogelstein, a former partner at Lazard Freres, joined Pincus to build the firm. Together they developed a strategy of investing in diversified companies of various sizes rather than focusing on start-ups. Pincus was the founder and chairman while Vogelstein was vice chairman and then president. Pincus and Vogelstein ran the company until 2002, when they stepped down and appointed Charles Kaye and Joseph P. Landy as co-presidents. Pincus died in 2009.

Warburg Pincus began investing in Europe in 1983 and opened its first office in Asia in 1994. It has invested more than $5 billion in Europe; more than $3 billion in India and more than $3.3 billion in China. The firm is headquartered in New York and has offices in Beijing, Berlin, Hong Kong, Houston, London, Mumbai, San Francisco, São Paulo, Shanghai and Singapore, with administrative offices in Amsterdam, Luxembourg and Mauritius.

The firm is structured as a global partnership led by CEO, Charles Kaye, and President, Timothy Geithner.

Initial public offerings
More than 140 Warburg Pincus companies have listed on exchanges, raising approximately $30 billion in public markets. In each of these IPOs, the firm was the principal financial investor in the portfolio company. The companies have listed on 13 exchanges, including at least 30 IPOs outside the U.S. In August 2010, a six-year partnership between management and Warburg Pincus led to MEG Energy's successful IPO.

Funds
Warburg Pincus has a history of venture capital investing. The firm is a founding member of the venture capital associations in the U.S. and China, and offers a global entrepreneur in residence program to help start up new businesses.

In October 2014, Reuters reported that Warburg Pincus had raised $4 billion for its first energy-focused private equity fund. In late 2018, Warburg Pincus closed its Warburg Pincus Global Growth, L.P. fund at $14.8 billion, and in June 2019, closed its Warburg Pincus China-Southeast Asia II, L.P. fund at $4.25 billion.

Warburg Pincus has invested in companies such as [CityMD &!The Summit Medical Group], Harbin Pharmaceutical, NIO, ZTO Express in China and South East Asia, Bharti Telecommunications, Apollo Tyres Ltd, Ecom Express, SBI General Insurance in India, AmRest in Poland and Nuance Communications in the U.S. In 2019, the firm acquired a majority stake in healthcare tech company WebPT from Battery Ventures.

Fight over the Warburg name
During the post-war period, Eric Warburg vied with his cousin Siegmund Warburg, founder of S.G. Warburg, over the use of the Warburg name in New York. Siegmund wished to expand the S.G. Warburg franchise into New York but was blocked by the existence of E.M. Warburg & Co. Following the effective sale of the business to Pincus, Siegmund Warburg accused Eric of prostituting the Warburg name. "Complicating matters was that Siegmund thought Pincus the wrong kind of Jew—of Eastern European ancestry, with a garment-district background. Professionally, he thought Pincus well below haute banque stature in the venture capital world."

In January 1970, Siegmund finally got the name changed to E.M. Warburg, Pincus & Company to differentiate it from S.G. Warburg & Company. "In the end, however, Lionel Pincus had the last laugh on Siegmund. He expanded Eric's tiny firm into a giant, thriving business, with three and a half billion dollars of venture capital partnerships."

In 1999, they attempted to purchase English Premier League association football club Everton F.C.

See also
 M. M. Warburg & Co.
 S. G. Warburg & Co.

References

External links
 
 Stocks held by Warburg Pincus LLC

 
1939 establishments in New York City
Companies based in New York City
Financial services companies established in 1939
Private equity firms of the United States
Warburg family
Warburg Pincus companies